This is a list of hospitals in Missouri.

1 to 1,200-bed hospitals

Alvin J. Siteman Cancer Center - St. Louis
Audrain Medical Center -  Mexico
Barnes-Jewish Hospital - St. Louis
Barnes-Jewish Saint Peters Hospital -  Saint Peters
Barnes-Jewish West County Hospital - Creve Coeur
Barton County Memorial Hospital -  Lamar
Bates County Memorial Hospital -  Butler
Boone Hospital Center - Columbia
Bothwell Regional Health Center - Sedalia
Cameron Regional Medical Center - Cameron
Capital Region Medical Center - Jefferson City
SSM Health Cardinal Glennon Children's Hospital - St. Louis
Carondelet Health - Blue Springs
Carondelet Health - Kansas City
Cass Medical Center - Harrisonville
Cedar County Memorial Hospital - Cedar County
Cedar County Memorial Hospital - El Dorado Springs
Centerpoint Medical Center - Independence
CenterPointe Hospital - Saint Charles
Children's Mercy Hospital - Kansas City
Children's Mercy Northland - Kansas City
Christian Hospital - Florissant
Christian Hospital - St. Louis
Citizens Memorial Healthcare - Bolivar
Columbia Regional Hospital - Columbia
Cooper County Memorial Hospital - Boonville
Cox Branson - Branson
Cox Monett - Monett
Cox North - Springfield
Cox South - Springfield
Cox Walnut Lawn - Springfield
CoxHealth - Springfield
Crittenton Behavioral Health - Kansas City
Crossroads Regional Medical Center - Wentzville
Deaconess Incarnate Word Health System - St. Louis
St. Lukes Des Peres Hospital (link directs to owner) - Des Peres
Doctors Hospital of Springfield - Springfield
Eastern Missouri State Hospital - Florissant
Ellett Memorial Hospital - Appleton City
Ellis Fischel Cancer Center - Columbia
Excelsior Springs Medical Center - Excelsior Springs
Fitzgibbon Hospital - Marshall
Freeman Cancer Institute - Joplin
Freeman Health System - Joplin
Freeman Heart Institute - Joplin
Freeman Neosho Hospital - Neosho
Freeman Orthopaedics & Sports Medicine - Joplin
Fulton Medical Center- Fulton 
Fulton State Hospital - Fulton
General Leonard Wood Army Community Hospital - Fort Leonard Wood
Golden Valley Memorial Hospital - Clinton
Hannibal Regional Hospital - Hannibal
Harry S. Truman Memorial Veterans' Hospital - Columbia
Hawthorn Children's Psychiatric Hospital - St. Louis
HCA Midwest Division - Kansas City
Heartland Behavioral Health Services - Nevada
Heartland Regional Medical Center - St. Joseph
Hedrick Medical Center - Chillicothe
Hermann Area District Hospital - Hermann
I-70 Community Hospital - Sweet Springs
Jefferson Memorial Hospital - Crystal City (Festus)
John J. Pershing VA Medical Center - Poplar Bluff
Kansas City VA Medical Center - Kansas City
Kindred Hospital - Kansas City - Kansas City
Kindred Hospital - St. Louis - St. Louis
Lafayette Regional Health Center - Lexington
Lake Regional Health System - Osage Beach
Lakeland Regional Hospital - Springfield
Lee's Summit Hospital - Lee's Summit
Liberty Hospital - Liberty
Madison Medical Center - Fredericktown
Mercy McCune-Brooks Hospital - Carthage (formerly known as McCune-Brooks Regional Hospital)
Mercy Hospital Joplin - Joplin (formerly St. John's Regional Medical Center)
Mercy Hospital St. John's - Aurora (formerly Aurora Hospital)
Mercy Hospital St. Louis - Creve Coeur
Mercy Hospital South, formerly St. Anthony's Medical Center - Sappington
Mercy Hospital Washington - Washington
Metropolitan Saint Louis Psychiatric Center - St. Louis
Mid Missouri Mental Health Center - Columbia
Mineral Area Regional Medical Center - Farmington
Missouri Baptist Hospital-Sullivan - Sullivan
Missouri Baptist Medical Center  - Town and Country
Missouri Delta Medical Center - Sikeston
Missouri Rehabilitation Center - Mount Vernon
Missouri Southern Healthcare - Sikeston
Moberly Regional Medical Center - Moberly
Nevada Regional Medical Center - Nevada
North Kansas City Hospital - North Kansas City
Northeast Missouri Rural Health Network (NMRHN) - Kirksville
Northeast Regional Medical Center - Kirksville
Northwest Medical Center - Albany
Ozarks Community Hospital - Springfield
Ozarks Medical Center - West Plains, Missouri
Parkland Health Center - Bonne Terre
Parkland Health Center - Farmington
Pemiscot Memorial Health Systems - Hayti
Perry County Memorial Hospital - Perryville
Pershing Memorial Hospital - Brookfield
Phelps Health - Rolla (formerly Phelps County Regional Medical Center)
Pike County Memorial Hospital - Louisiana
Progress West Hospital - O'Fallon
Putnam County Memorial Hospital - Unionville
Ranken Jordan Pediatric Specialty Hospital - Maryland Heights
Ray County Memorial Hospital - Richmond
The Rehabilitation Institute - Kansas City
The Rehabilitation Institute of St. Louis - St. Louis
Research Belton Hospital - Belton
Research Medical Center - Kansas City
Research Medical Center-Brookside Campus - Kansas City
Research Psychiatric Center - Kansas City
Reynolds County General Memorial Hospital - Ellington
Ripley County Memorial Hospital - Doniphan, Ripley County
Rusk Rehabilitation Center - Columbia
Sac-Osage Hospital - Osceola
Saint Alexius Hospital - St. Louis
Saint Francis Hospital & Health Services - Maryville
Saint Francis Medical Center - Cape Girardeau
Sainte Genevieve County Memorial Hospital - Sainte Genevieve
Saint John's Aurora Community Hospital - Aurora
Saint John's Breech Regional Medical Center - Lebanon
Saint John's Health System - Springfield
Saint John's Hospital - Cassville - Cassville
Saint John's Regional Health Center - Springfield
Saint John's Saint Francis Hospital -  Mountain View
Saint Joseph Health Center - Saint Charles
Saint Joseph Hospital of Kirkwood - Kirkwood
Saint Joseph Hospital West - Lake St. Louis
St. Joseph Medical Center - Kansas City
St. Louis Behavioral Medicine Institute - St. Louis
St. Louis Children's Hospital - St. Louis
Saint Louis University Health Science Center - St. Louis
Saint Louis University Hospital - St. Louis
St. Louis VA Medical Center - St. Louis
Saint Luke's East Hospital - Lee's Summit
Saint Luke's Health System - Kansas City
St. Luke's Hospital - Chesterfield
Saint Luke's Hospital - Kansas City
Saint Luke's North Hospital–Barry Road - Kansas City
Saint Luke's North Hospital–Smithville - Smithville
Saint Mary's Health Center - Jefferson City
Saint Mary's Hospital of Blue Springs - Blue Springs
Salem Memorial District Hospital - Salem, Missouri
Samaritan Hospital - Macon
Scotland County Memorial Hospital - Memphis, Scotland County
Select Specialty Hospital - St. Louis
Shriners Hospitals for Children - St. Louis
Southeast Missouri Community Treatment Center - Farmington
Southeast Missouri Hospital - Cape Girardeau
SouthPointe Hospital - St. Louis
SSM DePaul Health Center - Bridgeton
SSM Health Care - St. Louis
SSM Rehab - St. Louis
SSM Saint Mary's Health Center - Richmond Heights
Sullivan County Memorial Hospital - Milan
Tenet St. Louis -  St. Louis
Texas County Memorial Hospital - Houston
Three Rivers Healthcare - Poplar Bluff
University Health Truman Medical Center - Kansas City
University Health Lakewood Medical Center - Kansas City
Two Rivers Psychiatric Hospital - Kansas City
University Hospital - Columbia
University of Missouri Children's Hospital - Columbia
University of Missouri Health Care - Columbia
Washington County Memorial Hospital - Potosi
Washington University Medical Center - St. Louis
Western Missouri Medical Center - Warrensburg
Western Missouri Mental Health Center - Kansas City
Wright Memorial Hospital - Trenton

References

External links
Missouri hospitals

Missouri
 
Hospitals